Group Portrait with Lady is a novel by Nobel Prize winning author Heinrich Böll, published in 1971. The novel revolves around a woman named Leni, and her friends, foes, lovers, employers and others and in the end tells the stories of all these people in a small city in western Germany in the 1930s and 1940s. As is usual in Böll's novels, the main focus is the Nazi era, from the perspective of ordinary people.

The novel was adapted into a film in 1977.

External links
 "Portrait of a woman, a city and modern Germany— Heinrich Böll's best novel", review by Richard Locke in New York Times, May 6, 1973.

1971 German novels
Novels by Heinrich Böll
Novels set in Germany
German novels adapted into films
Kiepenheuer & Witsch books
Novels set in the 1930s
Novels set in the 1940s